Hoard (trademarked as HOARD) is an action-strategy video game developed by Canadian studio Big Sandwich Games Inc. It was released on November 2, 2010, in North America on PlayStation Network, on April 4, 2011, for the PC and Mac on Steam, and on June 2, 2011, on the PAL PlayStation Network regions.

Development
Hoard was released for the PlayStation 3 on November 2, 2010. The PSP version of Hoard was released on March 22, 2011, in the United States.

Reception 

Review aggregator Metacritic rated the PlayStation 3 version of Hoard at 75 percent and the PC version at 65 percent.

IGN awarded Hoard "Best Quick Fix" in their PlayStation 3 Best of 2010 Awards, and also nominated the game for "Best Competitive Multiplayer."

References

External links 
Official site
Developer site

2010 video games
Linux games
MacOS games
PlayStation 3 games
PlayStation Network games
PlayStation Portable games
Windows games
Action video games
Strategy video games
Multiplayer and single-player video games
Video games developed in Canada
Dragons in popular culture